The Stanford Cancer Institute is an NCI-designated Cancer Center at Stanford University in Palo Alto, CA. It is one of eight comprehensive cancer centers in California.

There are more than 400 faculty members of the Stanford Cancer Institute. Adult patients are treated at the Stanford Cancer Center.

History 
The Stanford Cancer Institute was founded in 2003 and first received NCI-designation as a clinical cancer center in 2007. In 2016, it received its comprehensive cancer center designation.

Stanford University was a founding member of the National Comprehensive Cancer Network in 1995.

In 2016, a new center was created as part of the Parker Institute for Cancer Immunotherapy. Stanford received $10 million from the Parker Foundation. This is a $250 million joint venture with five other cancer centers across the country.

In 2017, a donation by Jeffrey Rothschild established the Stanford Center for Cancer Cell Therapy, which supports research into the development of immunological based treatments for cancer.

References 

NCI-designated cancer centers
Stanford University